Aleksandrovo is a village in Lovech Municipality, Lovech Province, northern Bulgaria.

Aleksandrovo has a population of 1,548. It is an ethnically diverse village. Most people are Bulgarians (828), followed by Turks (447) and a few gypsies.

References

Villages in Lovech Province